Kouya Aristide Mabea (born 23 October 1998) is an Ivorian professional footballer who plays as a left-back for Belgian First Division A club Westerlo.

Honours 
Westerlo

 Belgian First Division B: 2021–22

References 

1998 births
Living people
Footballers from Abidjan
Ivorian footballers
Association football fullbacks
SOA (football club) players
Vitória S.C. players
Vitória S.C. B players
K.V.C. Westerlo players
Liga Portugal 2 players
Campeonato de Portugal (league) players
Challenger Pro League players
Ivorian expatriate footballers
Expatriate footballers in Portugal
Expatriate footballers in Belgium
Ivorian expatriate sportspeople in Portugal
Ivorian expatriate sportspeople in Belgium